EuroScience was founded in 1997 for the support and promotion of science and technology in Europe. EuroScience is a membership-based non-profit association to foster open debate about science and create networks in research and innovation. Its members include anyone interested in European research, whether professional scientists, policy-makers, industries or members of the public. 

The EuroScience headquarters are located in Strasbourg. Michael Matlosz is currently the President of EuroScience and Matthias Girod its Secretary General. 

The main issues EuroScience wants to address are:

 Sustainable Academic Careers, 
 Mental health, Public Engagement, 
 True Science Dialogue, 
 Inclusive Science, 
 Freedom and Societal Responsibility of Science, 
 Truly Open Science.

Aims and Activities

Aims 
EuroScience:
 provides an open forum for debate on science and technology and research policies in Europe
 strengthens the dialogue between science and society
 improves the research culture in Europe
 promotes responsible and sustainable innovation.

Activities 
Through its activities, EuroScience strives to empower individual researchers to create a modern, responsible and healthy European research community that has a positive impact on society. 

The activities are very diverse:

 ESOF - The EuroScience Open Forum is the flagship event of EuroScience.
 ESPF - The EuroScience Policy Forum has been launched for the first time in 2021 and will take place for the second time in 2023.
 Awarding the title of European City of Science.
 The European Young Researchers Award.
 The EuroScientist - is a participative webzine about science and innovation.
 Other past European projects: NewHoRRIzzon, RRI Tools etc.

EuroScience Open Forum
EuroScience organises the EuroScience Open Forum (ESOF) which brings together stakeholders involved in European science. The ESOF is held every two years and is hosted by a European city awarded the title European City of Science. By wandering through European cities, ESOF contributes to the development of a European Scientific Identity and stimulates policies to support scientific research. 

ESOF gives the opportunity to lead scientists, researchers, business people and entrepreneurs, innovators, policymakers and science communicators from all over Europe to discuss new discoveries and debate the direction that research is taking in all sciences, including social sciences and humanities.  

ESOF comprises

 A main Scientific Programme: a high-quality programme with many opportunities to debate with high-level speakers (Scientific sessions, plenary sessions, Key Notes, workshops, Field trips, poster presentations etc.
 An Exhibition
 Networking and other events: events and networking opportunities (Welcome Reception, delegate party etc.)
 The European Science in the City Festival: which offers the general public to discover more about science but also gives the opportunity to meet scientists and science professionals.

The past hosting cities of ESOF: 

2004:  Stockholm
 2006:  Munich
 2008:  Barcelona
 2010:  Turin
 2012:  Dublin
 2014:  Copenhagen
 2016:  Manchester
 2018:  Toulouse
 2020:  Trieste
 2022:  Leiden & the regional site Katowice
 2024:  Katowice

See also
 Science and technology in Europe
 Directorate-General for Research
 European Science Foundation
 European Research Area (ERA)
 Eurodoc
 Academia Europæa
 Lisbon Strategy

Sources
 EuroScience Open Forum 2006, Biotechnol J. 2006 Sep;1(9):890-1
 A new opportunity for science in Europe, Nature 1996;384:108
 Europas Wissenschaftler gründen ihre Lobby, die Euroscience, Die Zeit, Nr 13, 21 March 1997
 New Euroscience group, Research Europe, 20 nov. 1997, p. 6

External links
 EuroScience
 EuroScientist, the official publication of EuroScience
 EuroScience Open Forum (ESOF)
 Georgian National Section of EuroScience (ESGNS)
 Romanian section of EuroScience
 EuroScience Local Section in Russia

Science and technology in Europe
Pan-European scientific societies
Organizations established in 1997
